A -cell is a higher-dimensional version of a rectangle or rectangular solid. It is the Cartesian product of  closed intervals on the real line. This means that a -dimensional rectangular solid has each of its edges equal to one of the closed intervals used in the definition.  The  intervals need not be identical. For example, a 2-cell is a rectangle in  such that the sides of the rectangles are parallel to the coordinate axes. Every -cell is compact.

Formal definition 

The set of all points  in  whose coordinates satisfy the inequalities  is a -cell.

Intuition 

A -cell of dimension  is especially simple. A 2-cell is the rectangle formed by the Cartesian product of two closed intervals, and a 3-cell is a rectangular solid. 

The sides and edges of a -cell need not be equal in (Euclidean) length; although the unit cube (which has boundaries of equal Euclidean length) is a 3-cell, the set of all 3-cells with equal-length edges is a strict subset of the set of all 3-cells.

Notes

References 

 
 

Basic concepts in set theory
Compactness (mathematics)